Albert Clare Bice  (January 24, 1909 – May 18, 1976) was a Canadian artist, curator, and children's book author/illustrator.

Biography
Born in Durham, Ontario and raised in London, he received a Bachelor of Arts degree in History and English from the University of Western Ontario in 1928. From 1930 to 1932, he studied at the Art Students League of New York and Grand Central School of Art in New York. He worked included landscape painting, portrait painting, and figure painting. From 1940 to 1972, he was the curator of the Williams Memorial Art Gallery and Museum (it was renamed the London Regional Art and Historical Museums and now is called the Museum London).
He died on May 18, 1976 while on a sketching trip in Newfoundland.

Recognition and awards
He was a member of the Ontario Society of Artists, Canada's oldest continuously operating art society. From 1967 to 1970, he was the president of the Royal Canadian Academy of Arts.

In 1973, he was made a Member of the Order of Canada "for his contribution to the fine arts as painter, author-illustrator and gallery director".

Works
He was the author and illustrator of five children books: Jory's Cove (1941), Across Canada: Stories of Canadian Children (1949), The Great Island (1954), A Dog for Davie's Hill (1956), and Hurricane Treasure (1965).
He also illustrated six books by Canadian writer Catherine Anthony Clark (1892–1977): The Golden Pine Cone (1950), The Sun Horse (1951), The One-Wing Dragon (1955), The Silver Man (1958), The Diamond Feather (1962), and The Hunter and the Medicine Man (1966).

References

External links
 Clare Bice at Museum London

 Archives of Clare Bice (Clare Bice fonds, R11705) are held at Library and Archives Canada

1909 births
1976 deaths
Artists from London, Ontario
Canadian children's writers
Canadian art curators
Canadian illustrators
Members of the Order of Canada
People from Grey County
Writers from London, Ontario
University of Western Ontario alumni
Members of the Royal Canadian Academy of Arts
20th-century Canadian painters